BYU TV (stylized as BYUtv) is a television channel, founded in 2000, which is owned and operated as a part of Brigham Young University (BYU). The channel, available through cable and satellite distributors in the United States, produces a number of original series and documentaries with emphases in comedy, history, lifestyle, music and drama.  BYUtv also regularly broadcasts feature films, nature documentaries, acquired medical/crime dramas and religious programs (consistent with the university's sponsoring organization, The Church of Jesus Christ of Latter-day Saints). Additionally, BYUtv Sports is the primary broadcaster of BYU Cougars athletics, producing more than 125 live sporting events in 2012 alone. The channel has won multiple regional Emmy Awards, and several of its original series have been praised by national television critics.

BYUtv broadcasts all of its original content, and most acquired content, worldwide online via its website. BYUtv is also carried through KBYU-TV, a television station in Provo, Utah, also owned by the university, ensuring HD coverage across Salt Lake City and most of Utah. The channel is one of several operated by the university's BYU Broadcasting division, including the world feed BYUtv Global and BYUradio.
Multiple celebrity guests and artists have made special appearances on BYUtv, notably Imagine Dragons and Neon Trees on the series AUDIO-FILES; Lea Salonga, Howard Jones, Duncan Sheik and Sixpence None the Richer on The Song That Changed My Life; and Shawn Bradley, The Piano Guys, and Mates of State on Studio C. Major athletes like Steve Young, Ty Detmer and Jimmer Fredette have also appeared on special BYUtv Sports broadcasts.

History

BYUtv was founded in 2000, and has grown from a "relatively unknown cable channel on a single satellite" to a national provider on Dish Network, DirecTV, and over 600 cable systems in the US.

During 2010 and 2011, newly appointed BYUtv director of content, Scott Swofford, commissioned focus groups targeting TV viewers who were at least nominally religious, to see what they liked, disliked and wanted on TV. Swofford summarized the results as, "We want to be entertained. Then we'll stick around for the message." This led to the creation of the pilot for Granite Flats, which became BYUtv's first and flagship original scripted television drama series, and went on to significantly expand the channel's audience, eventually attracting about 500,000 viewers per episode, compared to the previous top-rated show, Love of Quilting, which typically drew under 10,000.

Programming
BYUtv produces shows under several categories: BYU Sports, Campus, Documentary, Faith, Family, Lifestyle, People, and Performing Arts. This includes original series, documentaries and religious service programs, along with family and faith-based films from several major studios.

Original series
9 Years to Neptune
5000 Days: Listen
After Further Review
All-Round Champion
Amelia Parker
American Ride
Audio-Files
Battle of the Ages
Best Cake Wins
BYU Sports Nation
BYUtv Sports Post Game
The Canterville Ghost
Chef Brad
Coordinators' Corner
Countdown to Kickoff
Dinner Takes All
Dwight in Shining Armor
Extinct
The Fixers
The Food Nanny
The Generations Project
Granite Flats
Holly Hobbie (Seasons 4-5)
Jeff's Homemade Game Show
The Kindness Diaries
Making Good
 Overlord and the Underwoods
Malory Towers
Painting the Town with Eric Dowdle
The Parent Trip
The Parker Andersons
Random Acts
Relative Race
Relative Race - After the Finish Line
Ruby and the Well
Saving Me
Show Offs
The Song That Changed My Life
The Story Trek
Story Trek: Trending
Studio C
Survivalists
Tricked (seasons 2-3)
Turning Point
Wayne Brady's Comedy IQ
The Wizard of Paws

Upcoming programming
Silverpoint (Entire series on BYUtv App & byutv.org Feb. 5, tv series debut Feb. 6)

Acquired programming
Backyard Builds
Heartland
Hetty Feather
Highway to Heaven 
Holly Hobbie (Seasons 1-3)
The Inspectors
Itch
Just Like Mom and Dad
Lark Rise to Candleford
Leave It to Bryan
Lucky Dog
Malory Towers
Splatalot!
Step Up to the Plate
The Chosen
Tricked (season 1)
Undercover High
Wind at My Back

Religious programming
Religious programming derives from the Church of Jesus Christ of Latter-day Saints, which owns and operates BYU. Some religious programming airs on Sundays or in the early morning hours on BYUtv:
BYU devotionals and forums
 BYU's Education Week and Women's Conference
Church Educational System and church devotionals
General Conference broadcasts and rebroadcasts
Music and the Spoken Word

BYU Sports
The channel is the primary home for most telecasts of BYU Cougars athletics, including select home and away games for football, men's and women's basketball, baseball, softball, gymnastics, men's and women's volleyball and women's soccer. Beginning in 2009, the network also began covering BYU-Hawaii Seasiders sports, including all conference home games in women's volleyball and men's basketball, as well as select conference home games in women's basketball and additional non-conference home games for men's basketball.

In 2011, BYUtv added the WCC Men's and Women's Basketball Tournaments to their sports broadcasts. BYUtv produced the first round and quarterfinals of the men's and women's basketball tournaments, which were also broadcast on ESPN3.com.

In 2011, ESPN reached a deal to become the official broadcaster for most games of the newly independent BYU Cougars football team. At least one home game per season would air live on BYUtv, along with reruns on BYUtv of home games broadcast on ESPN's networks. Its coverage also included pre-game and post-game shows, with the pre-game show Countdown to Kickoff hosted by BYU Cougars alumni Alema Harrington, Dave McCann and a rotating panel of analysts: Gary Sheide, Blaine Fowler, David Nixon, Brian Logan, and Jan Jorgensen. In 2014, Spencer Linton replaced Harrington on the panel.

Additionally, the network launched a separate website for its sports coverage, Byutvsports.com, in partnership with ESPN and IMG College. The site features news, video and free video on demand streaming of recent games. The site folded back into byutv.org in fall 2015.

The channel also produces its own sports shows including BYU Sports Nation (weekdays, 1 hr), BYU Sports Nation Game Day (formerly Countdown to Kickoff, preceding each football game, 1 hr), Postgame Show (following each football game, 30 m – 1 hr), After Further Review (weekly on Tuesdays, 1 hr), Inside BYU Football (weekly on Tuesdays, 1/2 hour) and previously carried Bronco Mendenhall's post-game press conferences for football games.

Availability
The network is currently available to approximately 65 million cable and DTH (direct-to-home) satellite subscribers in the United States. It is provided by nearly 600 cable operators around the United States. With its main-channel coverage on KBYU-TV, the station has full distribution throughout the Salt Lake City television market and the state of Utah.

BYUtv can be found through online streaming provided by Ooyala, on the Dish Network and DirecTV pay-satellite services, and free to air via 17 and Galaxy 28 in DVB-S2 format.

In 2011, live-streaming of BYUtv as well as on demand programs were made available through the iPad, iPhone, iPod and Roku streaming player. In August 2013, BYUtv released its app for Android. In April 2014, BYUtv released its app for Xbox 360. In 2015, BYUtv released its apps for Chromecast, FireTV, and Fire tablets and phones.

References

External links

BYUtv Sports
Lyngsat chart for Galaxy 17
Lyngsat chart for Galaxy 28

Television networks in the United States
Brigham Young University
English-language television stations in the United States
Religious television stations in the United States
College basketball on television in the United States
College football on television
College sports television networks
Television channels and stations established in 2000
2000 establishments in Utah